Arsen Borysovych Slotyuk (born 28 December 1993) is a Ukrainian professional footballer who plays as a centre-back for Ukrainian side Ahrobiznes Volochysk.

Career
On 19 July 2022 he moved to LNZ Cherkasy.

References

External links
 Profile on Ahrobiznes Volochysk official website
 
 

1993 births
Living people
Sportspeople from Ternopil
Ukrainian footballers
Association football defenders
FC Ahrobiznes Volochysk players
Kotwica Kołobrzeg footballers
FC LNZ Cherkasy players
Ukrainian First League players
Ukrainian Second League players
III liga players
Ukrainian expatriate footballers
Expatriate footballers in Poland
Ukrainian expatriate sportspeople in Poland